Dryja is a Polish coat of arms. It was used by several szlachta families in the times of the Polish–Lithuanian Commonwealth.

History

Blazon
Gules, on a bend sinister raguled of the same, three jewels or.

Notable bearers
Notable bearers of this coat of arms include:
 Przedpełko Kropidłowski (15th century)
 Dezydery Chłapowski Baron (1788—1879)
 Przybysław Dyjamentowski (1694—1774)
 The Lisiewski family became well known as a family of portrait painters in Germany.

See also
 Polish heraldry
 Heraldry
 Coat of arms

References 

Dryja